Round Lake Beach is a northern suburb of Chicago in Lake County, Illinois, United States. Per the 2020 census, the population was 27,252.

The United States Census Bureau defines an urban area of northwest Chicago-area suburbs that are separated from Chicago's urban area, with Round Lake Beach as the principal city: the Round Lake Beach–McHenry–Grayslake, IL–WI urban area had a population of 261,835 as of the 2020 census, making it the 155th largest in the United States. The village, along with the rest of the Round Lake area, has a significant Mexican population with many Latino businesses, restaurants, and shops throughout the town. There’s also a population of Central Americans and Puerto Ricans. Round Lake Beach has the second highest Latino population in Lake County, after nearby Waukegan.

Geography
Round Lake Beach is a mid-sized town located at  (42.3790210, -88.0810720).

Major streets
 
 Monaville Road
 Fairfield Road
 Rollins Road
 Cedar Lake Road
 Hook Drive
 Hainesville Road

Demographics

2020 census

Note: the US Census treats Hispanic/Latino as an ethnic category. This table excludes Latinos from the racial categories and assigns them to a separate category. Hispanics/Latinos can be of any race.

2000 Census
As of the census of 2000, there were 25,859 people, 7,349 households, and 6,026 families residing in the village. The racial makeup of the village was 54.35% White, 13.06% African American, 0.62% Native American, 2.07% Asian, 0.04% Pacific Islander, 16.97% from other races, and 2.89% from two or more races. Hispanic or Latino of any race were 41.26% of the population.

There were 7,349 households, out of which 53.4% had children under the age of 18 living with them, 66.2% were married couples living together, 10.5% had a female householder with no husband present, and 18.0% were non-families. 14.0% of all households were made up of individuals, and 4.5% had someone living alone who was 65 years of age or older. The average household size was 3.50 and the average family size was 3.83.

In the village, the population was spread out, with 35.0% under the age of 18, 9.4% from 18 to 24, 36.4% from 25 to 44, 14.6% from 45 to 64, and 4.6% who were 65 years of age or older. The median age was 28 years. For every 100 females, there were 101.8 males. For every 100 females age 18 and over, there were 100.9 males.

The median income for a household in the village was $59,359, and the median income for a family was $61,637. Males had a median income of $39,439 versus $28,165 for females. The per capita income for the village was $18,113. About 3.2% of families and 5.1% of the population were below the poverty line, including 5.0% of those under age 18 and 11.2% of those age 65 or over.

Notable people

 Tim Unroe, first baseman for the Milwaukee Brewers, Anaheim Angels, and Atlanta Braves; born in Round Lake Beach

Transportation 
Round Lake Beach has a station on Metra's North Central Service, which provides rail service between Antioch and Chicago Union Station Monday through Friday.  The village of Round Lake Beach does approximately $3 to $4 million in infrastructure improvement per year using TIF and MFT funds.

References

External links
 

1937 establishments in Illinois
Chicago metropolitan area
Populated places established in 1937
Villages in Illinois
Villages in Lake County, Illinois
Majority-minority cities and towns in Lake County, Illinois